The Snow Hole is located in the Taconic Mountains, New York, USA along the ridge line between Bald Mountain and the White Rock (Taconic Mountains). It is a crevasse in which snow can be found well into the summer. The Snow Hole can be accessed by hiking the Taconic Crest Trail about 2.75 miles north from the Petersburgh Pass parking area just off of Route 2. However, that is a separate mountain summit and not the actual Snow Hole. The posted hiking map at the kiosk to the Taconic Crest Trail at Petersburgh Pass has the location correctly identified. Typically the crevasse has snow at the bottom of it year round.

Numerous engravings in the rocks surrounding the Snow Hole include names and dates of visitors dating to the 19th century.  The oldest carving found is from the early 19th century.

Other examples of persistent snow include the snow patches in Scotland. These areas are associated with a characteristic cold-loving flora and fauna and it is likely that the Snow Hole also served as a refugium for small ice age species. Both are examples of nivation hollows.

References
Hopkins Memorial Forest trail map showing the location of the snow hole
Google maps showing the location of the "Snow Hole Summit"
MountainZone.com page on the snow hole summit
Snow patches in Lebanon
A gallery of snow patches in Arctic National Park

Further reading 

Taconic Mountains
Landforms of Rensselaer County, New York
Landforms of New York (state)
Landforms of the United States